Alaska is a 1996 American adventure survival film directed by Fraser Clarke Heston and produced by Andy Burg. The story, written by Burg and Scott Myers, centers on two children who search through the Alaskan wilderness for their lost father. During their journey, they find a polar bear who helps lead them to their father.  However, a poacher with a desire to capture the bear follows close behind the children and the polar bear. The director's father, Charlton Heston, plays the main antagonist. The movie was filmed primarily in the Purcell Mountains of British Columbia in Canada and the city of Vancouver. The film was a box office bomb, grossing only $11,829,959 over a $24 million budget. It received negative reviews upon its release.

Plot
Jake Barnes is flying a plane over the Alaskan wilderness. While he is flying, he is communicating with a man named Charlie, who works for Quincy Air Service. A polar bear cub and its mother are then shown playing in the snow, not knowing that they are being watched by a pair of poachers, Colin Perry and Mr. Koontz, and the adult bear is then shot, leaving the cub orphaned.

Jake's daughter Jessie and her friend Chip are observing wildlife in their kayaks before her dinner. Jake begins telling her where he is flying from, at what time he left that location, and his air speed. Jessie calculates that her father is passing Devils Thumb. Jake then lands his plane on a lake, where Charlie is waiting to tie the plane up to the dock. His son, Sean scolds his father for moving their family to Alaska after their mother's death. As Jake is making an emergency run, his plane's engines stall, causing him to lose control and crash in the Alaska wilderness. Frustrated by the lack of search effort by the police, Sean and Jessie go out to find their father on their own.

As they kayak through the chilly waters of the Gulf of Alaska, they stop to rest on a beach. They soon realize that the shore is home to a poachers' camp. They then discover the skin of a polar bear and the young polar bear from earlier, that has been locked in a cage. They let the polar bear run free, hoping that it will save itself. After the bear leaves their camp, Colin Perry appears, in hunt of the polar bear that he believes is rightfully his property as he intends to sell the cub to a client in Hong Kong. Koontz then arrives and notices teeth marks on the frying pan, alerting Perry that the bear was there. Colin's beliefs that the children stole the bear from his camp are confirmed when he finds his missing lighter next to their camping gear. Perry orders the kids to tell the bear to "come home" (Perry is referring to the cage at his camp as the bear's home). The next day, Jessie and Sean continue in their search to find their missing father. They leave their kayak and begin searching on foot. They soon discover that the polar bear has once again followed them on their journey. Perry and Koontz, too, have followed the youngsters, and this time, they destroy the oars in their kayak and hide the kayak in the woods just in case someone comes looking for them. Just then, Charlie arrives in a helicopter in search of Jessie and Sean. Perry shows Charlie a piece of the oar and tells him that he found it 25 miles north of their current position. Charlie then departs in his helicopter in hopes of finding the children, who he believes to be in grave danger and eventually discovers the two men were actually poachers after finding their campsite.

Jessie safely reaches the bottom, but Sean slips and tumbles down the mountain, hitting his head on a rock. The two then continue their journey and find a log cabin in the woods. They take shelter and Sean lies down in the bed. While in the cabin, Sean notices a canoe hanging from the ceiling. Jessie and Sean take the canoe and continue on in their search for their father. While they are canoeing down a river, the two kids encounter vicious rapids that send them and their canoe down a waterfall. Jessie is able to escape the raging river but once again, Sean's lack of experience in the wilderness causes him to struggle. He is thrust down the river where he is helped out of the cold water by Jessie's friend Chip and his grandfather Ben. As the kids recover by the riverside, Chip's father wants to send Jessie and Sean home, but Ben and Chip wish to help the two on their journey. The two proceed on their quest with their befriended polar bear, whom they named Cubby, by their side.

Cubby leads them until he is shot with a tranquilizer dart by Colin. He then takes Cubby away in his helicopter, but Koontz didn't load the darts with enough tranquilizer fluids, allowing Cubby to awaken in the helicopter and trying to fight his way free. As Koontz lowers the helicopter, Cubby escapes and bites Perry's right knee, causing Perry to shoot Koontz with a tranquilizer dart and damage the helicopter as well. Meanwhile, the children continue on in their search for their missing father. They stumble upon some wreckage from his plane crash and begin yelling for him to respond. Not able to yell, their father shoots another flare into the air. This time the children see it and run to his rescue. They find the plane hanging on the edge of a cliff, and Jessie lowers Sean down the side of the mountain to reach their father. Just as it looks like Jessie is going to lose control of the rope, Cubby appears and helps Jessie pull the rope. With Cubby's help, Jessie and Sean are able to raise their father up the side of the mountain. Just as the family is reunited, Charlie shows up in his helicopter to take them home and complete the rescue. Perry and Koontz are then shown to be trekking from their now disabled helicopter after their skirmish with Cubby, and Cubby is then introduced to a new polar bear family after saying good-bye to Sean and Jessie.

Cast
 Thora Birch as Jessie Barnes
 Vincent Kartheiser as Sean Barnes
 Dirk Benedict as Jake Barnes
 Charlton Heston as Colin Perry, the Poacher
 Duncan Fraser as Mr. Koontz, Perry's Pilot
 Gordon Tootoosis as Ben, Quincy General Store
 Ben Cardinal as Charlie, Quincy Air Service
 Ryan Kent as Chip
 Don S. Davis as Sergeant Sam Grazer
 Dolly Madsen as Mrs. Ben
 Stephen E. Miller as Trooper Sam Harvey
 Byron Chief-Moon as Chip's Grandfather
 Kristin Lehman as Florence

Reception

Box office 
The film managed to bring in US domestic revenues of only $11,829,959 against a production budget of $24 million.

Critical response 
On Rotten Tomatoes, the film has an approval rating of 23% based on reviews from 13 critics, with an average of 4.70 out of 10.

Emanuel Levy of Variety wrote: "Beautiful vistas, Thora Birch and a cute bear can't compensate for the routine story and sloppy direction of this old-fashioned family adventure."
Jeff Vice of the Deseret News wrote: "Really bad performances, an awful script straight out of a TV movie of the week and one of the least appealing, most irritating young heroes in recent screen history."

References

External links
 

1996 films
1990s adventure films
1990s teen drama films
American aviation films
American survival films
Castle Rock Entertainment films
Columbia Pictures films
1990s English-language films
Films about aviation accidents or incidents
Films about polar bears
Films about families
Films about missing people
Films about siblings
Films directed by Fraser Clarke Heston
Films set in Alaska
Films shot in Alaska
Films shot in British Columbia
Films shot in Vancouver
Mountaineering films
Rowing films
Teen adventure films
1996 drama films
1990s American films